Pogona nullarbor, the Nullabor bearded dragon, is a species of agama found in Australia.

References

Pogona
Agamid lizards of Australia
Reptiles described in 1976